Cymindis californica is a species of ground beetle in the subfamily Harpalinae. It was described by G. Horn in 1895.

References

californica
Beetles described in 1895